Chesterfield Road may refer to the following roads in England:

Chesterfield Road (Ashford), Ashford, Kent
Chesterfield Road (Bolsover), Bolsover, Derbyshire
Chesterfield Road (Bristol), Bristol, 
Chesterfield Road (Dronfield), Dronfield, Derbyshire
Chesterfield Road (Hounslow), Hounslow, London Borough of Hounslow in Greater London
Chesterfield Road (Liverpool), Liverpool, Merseyside
Chesterfield Road (Matlock), Matlock, Derbyshire
Chesterfield Road (Sheffield), Sheffield, South Yorkshire